Corporate Property Investors was a real estate investment trust that built several notable shopping centers, including Lenox Square in Atlanta, the Burlington Mall in Massachusetts, and Roosevelt Field Mall in New York.

History
CPI was founded in 1971 by Disque Deane.

From 1977 to 1998, fashion buyer and pioneering art patron Rosalind Gersten Jacobs was director of merchandise and marketing.

In 1982, the company financed the General Motors Building in Manhattan with $500 million and received an option to buy the building.

In 1991, the company acquired the General Motors Building for $500 million.

In January 1998, The Rouse Company bid for the company. However, Rouse was outbid and CPI was acquired by Simon Property Group.

The General Motors Building was sold separately to Donald Trump and CNO Financial Group for $800 million.

References

Real estate investment trusts of the United States
American companies established in 1971
Real estate companies established in 1971
1971 establishments in the United States